Lotte de Beer (born 11 August 1981) is a Dutch opera director.

Biography
Raised in Mheer in the Zuid-Limburg region of Limburg, de Beer studied singing and piano in her youth.  She subsequently developed an interest in acting, and studied acting at the Toneelschool Maastricht.  She subsequently studied directing at the Amsterdam University of the Arts, from which she graduated in 2009.  She was a prizewinner in the Ton Lutz Awards in 2009 for grooste regietalent (greatest directing talent), for her production of Hauptling Abendwind / Vent du Soir.  Her mentors have included Peter Konwitschny and Pierre Audi.

In 2010, de Beer founded Operafront, an opera company based in Amsterdam focused on small-scale and experimental productions of opera, and became its first artistic director.  Her work with contemporary opera has included directing the premiere productions of the new operas Waiting for Miss Monroe and The New Prince, both for Dutch National Opera.

Outside of The Netherlands, de Beer directed the Bavarian State Opera's first full staging of Puccini's Il Trittico, in Italian, in December 2017.  She has directed productions at the Bregenz Festival, the Aalto-Musiktheater (Essen), the Theater an der Wien, the Münchener Biennale and Oper Leipzig.  In October 2020, the Vienna Volksoper announced the appointment of de Beer as its next artistic director, the first woman ever named to the post, effective 1 September 2022, with an initial contract of 5 years.

In 2015, de Beer was a prize winner in the Newcomer category of the International Opera Awards in London.

References

External links
 Alferink Artists Management agency page on Lotte de Beer
 Dutch National Opera & Ballet biography of Lotte de Beer
 Official homepage of Operafront
 George Loomis, "Opera for an Era When Money Is Tight".  The New York Times, "IHT Rendezvous" blog, 24 February 2013

Living people
Dutch opera directors
1981 births